The Manzhou Beach is a beach in Kenting National Park, Hengchun Township, Pingtung County, Taiwan.

Architecture
The parking lot for the beach features a white pillar.

Activities
The beach is a place for people to go surfing.

See also
 List of tourist attractions in Taiwan

References

Beaches of Taiwan
Landforms of Pingtung County